The Wiwannihorn is a mountain of the Pennine Alps, located north of Ausserberg in the canton of Valais. It lies on the range between the Bietschtal and the Baltschiedertal, south of the Bietschhorn.

The Wiwannihorn can be climbed easily on its normal route with proper equipment. Several more technical, multi-pitch free climbing and alpine climbing routes lead to the top as well.  The most famous is probably the Steinadlerroute. The basecamp for climbing the Wiwannihorn is the Wiwanni hut  that is accessible from Ausserberg via a hiking trail or a via ferrata through the Baltschieder valley.

References

External links
 Description of climbing routes (topos) leading to the top of the Wiwannihorn
 Wiwannihorn on Hikr

Mountains of the Alps
Alpine three-thousanders
Mountains of Switzerland
Mountains of Valais
Bernese Alps